Skelmersdale  is a town in Lancashire, England, on the River Tawd,  west of Wigan,  northeast of Liverpool and  southwest of Preston. In 2006, it had a population of 38,813. The town is known locally as Skem .

While the first record of the town is in the Domesday Book of 1086, much of the town, including the current town centre, was developed as a second wave new town in the 1960s. The town's initial development as a coal town coincided with the Industrial Revolution  in the 19th century; the town lies on the Lancashire Coalfield.

Geography
Skelmersdale is situated in a small valley on the River Tawd. The town was designed to accommodate both nature and compact housing estates, and the town centre contains a large amount of forestation. The Beacon Country Park lies to the east of Skelmersdale, where the Beacon Point lies, along with a golf club. Furthermore, the Tawd Valley Park runs through the centre of the town, where improvement efforts from the council are currently ongoing.

The town borders the village of Up Holland to the east, West Lancashire's administrative centre Ormskirk to the north-west, and St Helens to the south. Furthermore, the town lies on the periphery of Wigan and Greater Manchester. The M58 runs to the south of Skelmersdale, from Wigan to Liverpool.

The New Town is the larger eastern part of the town which was built primarily in the 1960s as a second wave new town, and the 'Old Town' is the much smaller and older part of the town in the south west; Skelmersdale was mentioned in the Domesday Book of 1086. The town is further divided into seven wards: Skelmersdale North, Skelmersdale South, Birch Green, Ashurst, Digmoor, Moorside and Tanhouse.

History

Toponymy
Skelmersdale means "Skjaldmarr's valley", from the Old Norse personal name Skjaldmarr + probably Old Norse dalr (or Old English dæl) "dale, valley". The name was recorded as Skalmeresedel in 1136.

It is locally known as "Skem", with a further distinction being made between "Old Skem" (the area which was a small mining town before 1961) and the broader swathe of development on the east side of the town.

Early history
Until the creation of Skelmersdale Urban District Council at the end of the 19th century, the town was part of the Parish of Ormskirk in the West Derby hundred, an ancient subdivision of Lancashire, covering the southwest of the county.

In the mid-14th century, the manor of Skelmersdale was held by William Dacre, 2nd Baron Dacre.

Modern history
In 1858, Blague Gate railway station in Skelmersdale was opened on the new Ormskirk to Rainford line. It was renamed to Skelmersdale railway station in 1874, before closing in 1956 and its demolition shortly after 1968.

Skelmersdale's population in 1851 was only 760, but 50 years later it had increased to 5,699. It was a busy coal mining town. Sadly, there were over 100 fatalities in Skelmersdale collieries from 1851 to 1900, according to the Reports of the Inspectors of Coal Mines, and an unknown number of serious injuries. In 1880 there were 14 Skelmersdale collieries—most of them closed in the 1920s and '30s.

The miners, many of whom were Welsh immigrants, brought with them their own brand of Nonconformist Christianity. By the start of the 20th century there were at least six dissenting chapels in the town: two Wesleyan (Berry Street, closed in the 1920s, and Liverpool Road, closed 1969), an independent Methodist, a Primitive Methodist, a Congregational and a Welsh Chapel (closed in 1963).

Today, there is little to remind people that the town was part of the once great Lancashire Coalfield, although a Skelmersdale Heritage Society was re-established in 2019.

There were also numerous brickworks in the area, and in the early-20th century Victoria County History, Skelmersdale was described as "a particularly bare, unpleasing district" owing to its coal mines and brickworks.

New town
In 1961 Skelmersdale was designated a new town, designed to house overspill population from the north Liverpool conurbation. The town was the first in the second wave of designations.

Skelmersdale endured mixed economic fortunes during the last three decades of the 20th century. With the economic downturn in the late 1970s, large industrial employers left the town en masse, resulting in an increase in crime, drug abuse and poverty. Today, West Lancashire has a crime rate below the national average. 2006 saw a regeneration drive for the town coordinated through English Partnerships and the Northwest Regional Development Agency and publicly headed by the designer Wayne Hemingway. Among the proposals was a new central focus for the entertainment and commerce for the town in the evening.

In 2012, a £20m vision to create a regenerated town centre for Skelmersdale was revealed. It is expected to create as many as 500 permanent jobs, and current projections seem to satisfy that target. Although Skelmersdale faces a looming employment crisis, the regeneration of the town centre is a step towards recovery, and up to 100 extra jobs would be generated during the scheme's construction phase alone.

Proposals included a new food store as well as a number of bars, shops and restaurants, and a five-screen cinema. A new promenade would be fronted by these establishments to overlook the Tawd Valley Park, and a new civic square would also be created between the Concourse Shopping Centre and the town library. Regeneration specialists St Modwen have been working on the proposals with West Lancashire Council and the Homes and Communities Agency.

In January 2020, work began on a new Lidl supermarket and a B&M store, and work began on a new two-screen cinema operated by US company Star Cinemas in May 2020, which opened in May 2021 under the name Ultra Star Cinema (However it was re-branded to “Capitol Cinema” during June 2021. In June 2020, Lancashire County Council acquired the site of the former Glenburn Sports College, and approved £2 million of funding to demolish the site and prepare the location for development as a railway station. There are also plans to move forward with a new high street linking the Concourse Shopping Centre with West Lancashire College's campus.

Transport

Road

Skelmersdale has been designed to work on a roundabout system and there is only one set of traffic lights in the town. For ease of access, there is a subway network allowing pedestrians to move through the town without needing to cross potentially hazardous roads. However, the subway system was called into question in 2020 by West Lancashire MP Rosie Cooper and others with regard to its safety and sustainability, as they are not regularly maintained by the county council.

The M58 motorway runs along the south of Skelmersdale from the nearby M6 motorway to the Switch Island interchange at Liverpool. The A570 and the A577 both provide connections.

The New Town areas of Skelmersdale have a road-naming system where residential streets rarely feature words such as "Road" and "Street" and single-name roads are common, e.g. Abbeywood, Fairburn, Brierfield, Thornwood. "Road", "Street", "Lane" and "Drive" do appear in road names, but only in the parts of the town that pre-date the New Town development. The road names in New Town areas are also arranged in a loosely alphabetical format with large areas being defined by a single letter, for example, Larkhill, Leeswood, Ledburn and Lindens all connect to Ashley Road in the Ashurst area.

Roads in the industrial estates and the main roads in the town such as Gillibrands Road follow the usual naming conventions, although the industrial estates do feature street names beginning with the same letter. For example, Pikelaw Place, Penketh Place, Pinfold Place and Priorswood Place are all part of the Pimbo Industrial Estate.

Bus

In September 2011, the company providing most of Skelmersdale's bus services, Arriva North West, closed its depot in Skelmersdale, which employed 129 people. The depot was first constructed for Ribble Motor Services in the 1970s, and the premises were sold. Skelmersdale is now served by buses from Arriva depots in St Helens, Bootle and Southport. In 2023, a Stagecoach service in Kirkby was introduced.

Rail
Since the closure of Skelmersdale railway station in 1956, the town has become the second most populous town in the North West, after Leigh, without a railway station. The nearest railway station is Upholland railway station on the Wigan Wallgate to Kirkby branch line (historically part of the Liverpool and Bury Railway line). The Skelmersdale Branch previously connected Skelmersdale to Ormskirk and Rainford Junction.

In 2009, Network Rail proposed to extend the existing quarter-hourly Liverpool Central to Kirkby service, to terminate at a new station in the centre of Skelmersdale. Rainford will then become an interchange station for services to and from Wigan Wallgate. In 2009, the Association of Train Operating Companies published a report, Connecting Communities, which also recommended the opening of a new rail link to Skelmersdale. This time the recommendation was via the Skelmersdale Branch from Ormskirk. In February 2017, Lancashire County Council identified the site of the former Glenburn Sports College / Westbank Campus site as the preferred location for a railway station for the town. Despite the Glenburn Sports College being owned by the council, the Westbank Campus site is owned by Newcastle College and requires purchase by the council in order for the station to be built.
In 2017, Merseytravel and Lancashire County Council committed £5 million into a study to investigate the possibility of re-opening the station. Combined with the creation of a new station at Headbolt Lane in Kirkby, it is believed that the scheme could cost around £300 million to develop.

In 2020, Lancashire County Council acquired the site of the former Glenburn Sports College, and approved £2 million to demolish the buildings on the site and prepare the area for the construction of a railway station.

Plans for the reopening were dealt a blow when the Department for Transport announced in July 2022 that it was rejecting the Strategic Outline Business Case. The DfT instead suggested that better bus links with the Kirkby–Wigan rail line would be a cheaper way of improving connectivity for Skelmersdale.

Education and culture
Skelmersdale has a number of primary schools, and had two high schools: Our Lady Queen of Peace Catholic Engineering College and Lathom High School. Glenburn Sports College closed on 31 August 2016 following an unsuccessful campaign backed by local MP Rosie Cooper to prevent the closure.

West Lancashire College has a campus in the centre of the town. The college merged with Newcastle College in 2007 and was graded as 'outstanding' in a recent Ofsted inspection. In 2021, Brian Cox launched the college's 'School of Science', a £1.3 million facility with the intention of increasing the number of students who study science, technology, engineering and mathematics.

There is a Transcendental Meditation movement community within Skelmersdale, called "European Sidhaland". It has a Maharishi School which, as of 2019, performed 'well above average' according to Ofsted. In 2011, it was one of 24 schools that applied for and received government funding as a flagship free school.

Skelmersdale is also home to a large public library with facilities including free internet access and an extensive local history section.

The town is host to a number of cultural and social organisations, such as the Artz Centre which provides opportunities in creative fields, and The Birchwood Centre which aims to reduce social isolation and homelessness.

The town featured in TV series Utopia and features in the musical Blood Brothers.

Social issues
According to urban planning consultancy Space Syntax, Skelmersdale's fragmented streets have made its centre relatively inaccessible and this has resulted in segregated land use. According to a 2017 Lancashire County Council report, Skelmersdale has one of the highest percentages of children living in poverty in Lancashire at 27%, and the highest accident and emergency attendance rate in Lancashire for 0–4 and 5–19 year olds. Furthermore, Skelmersdale's poverty levels are above the national average.

However, Skelmersdale's crime rates are below the Lancashire average at 66 crimes per 1,000 people, and was the tenth safest medium-sized town in Lancashire in 2020. Skelmersdale was the worst medium-sized town in Lancashire in 2020 for drugs.

Economy
Although consisting predominantly of housing estates, Skelmersdale's industry includes the Co-operative Bank which employs 650 people, distribution centres for Asda, P&G, Victorian Plumbing, a Walkers snack food factory, Chemist 4 U and many others. Skelmersdale houses the corporate base and a distribution centre for Matalan, the discount clothing and homewares store. Frederick's Dairies,now owned by R&R Ice Cream UK Ltd who make ice cream for Cadbury, and many others, are located in Skelmersdale.

Town centre
Skelmersdale's town centre is made up of the Concourse Shopping Centre, (colloquially known as "the Connie") as well as the Asda supermarket, a library, a swimming pool and gym named after former Minister of Health Aneurin Bevan, another gym, West Lancashire College's main campus, a car garage and a new development including a Lidl supermarket, Poundstretcher and a B&M store.

The Concourse is home to a number of national chain stores such as Poundland, Home Bargains and Argos, as well as a McDonald's restaurant and KFC, both of which are located in the nearby car park. In early 2020, a Domino's Pizza chain was opened on the ground floor. The Concourse used to have an artwork by Alan Boyson, in the shape of a pyramid. The pyramid was located in front of the entrance opposite the ecumenical centre until the early to mid-1980s but was removed for safety reasons.

There are also smaller shopping parades in Skelmersdale which include Sandy Lane Shopping Centre, Digmoor Parade and Ashurst Shopping Centre.

Politics

Skelmersdale is in the West Lancashire parliamentary constituency, and has been represented by Ashley Dalton, a Labour Party MP, since the 2023 West Lancashire by-election. Furthermore, as of June 2021, Skelmersdale is represented by three Labour Party councillors across three wards on Lancashire County Council and fifteen of sixteen borough councillors for wards in Skelmersdale on West Lancashire Borough Council are members of the Labour Party, with one independent councillor. Until the 2021 United Kingdom local elections, Skelmersdale had only elected Labour Party councillors for over fifty years.

Skelmersdale Independent Party, established in February 2019, is active in the town and advocates for the establishment of a Skelmersdale Town Council. While the party has contested multiple seats on West Lancashire Borough Council, it has been unsuccessful in gaining seats.

Sports
The town's football team, Skelmersdale United F.C., plays in the West Division of the Northern Premier League and was a FA Vase winner in 1971. One of its former players, Steve Heighway, went on to play for Liverpool. Former Everton midfielder Leon Osman, who takes his son to Dalton St Michael's Primary School in nearby Dalton, played for the club in his youth. Former Cardiff City player Craig Noone also once played for the club. Skelmersdale Football Club is currently located at JMO Sports Park in the town.

The town is host to an archery club, the Bowmen of Skelmersdale, whose collective members hold 19 county records and 14 world records held by three members of the same family (Melissa-Jane, Harriet and Gary Daniel), six of which were claimed at the National Flight Championships on 19 August 2006 held at RAF Church Fenton. Furthermore, Skelmersdale Cricket Club was established in 1891.

The Merseyside Nighthawks, an American football team who play at JMO Sports Park in the town, are members of the BAFA National Leagues and play in the Premier North Division.

Cadet forces
Skelmersdale has units of the Air Training Corps, Army Cadet Force and Sea Cadet Corps. These units take part in the local community life and are routinely seen attending the Remembrance Sunday parade in the old town.

Air Training Corps
1439 (Skelmersdale) Squadron, Air Cadets, formed at Upholland Grammar School in 1941 as the 'Beacon Squadron' and provided airmanship training for young men and those about to join the RAF in time for the Battle of Britain. The squadron continues to provide airmanship training to young men and women in addition to other activities. They are based on Daniels Lane.

Army Cadet Force
The Army Cadets are part of 'S' Company of the Lancashire Force. They are based on Daniels Lane.

Sea Cadets Corps
The Sea Cadets has a unit in Skelmersdale that trains cadets aged from 10 to 17 years. The unit is located on Tawd Road.

Notable people

  Leon Osman is a footballer who was born in Wigan, but raised in Skelmersdale. He attended Up Holland High School and Winstanley College.
 Matt Woods, a footballer, was born in Skelmersdale. He played for multiple clubs, but most notably Everton F.C. and Blackburn Rovers F.C.
 John Anderton, professional footballer born in Skelmersdale.
 Thomas Aspinwall, trade unionist born in Bickerstaffe but lived in Skelmersdale
 Stephen James Bennett, musician and writer
 John Littlewood, chess player, born in Sheffield, resided in Skelmersdale.
 Harry Swainston, footballer at the turn of the 20th century for Burnley

Twin towns
West Lancashire is twinned with
Erkrath (Germany) and Cergy-Pontoise (France).

See also

Listed buildings in Skelmersdale
West Lancashire
Lancashire County Council
West Lancashire College
Lathom High School

References

Further reading
 Wilson, L. Hugh (1964) Skelmersdale new town planning proposals: report on basic plan prepared for the Skelmersdale Development Corporation by L. Hugh Wilson, Hugh Wilson & Lewis Womersley Chartered Architects & Town Planners, with a foreword by A. J. Kentish Barnes, Chairman of the Skelmersdale Development Corporation, Skelmersdale Development Corporation;
 Riley, Frank (1986) People in Need of a Future: A Survey of the Long-term Unemployed in Skelmersdale Ecumenical Centre, Northway, Skelmersdale;
 Howe, Don and Frank Riley (1982) Skem – The Broken Promise: Unemployment in Skelmersdale New Town Liverpool Industrial Ecumenical Mission;

External links

Skelmersdale Heritage Society website
Potential Rail Improvements in North Western England – Evidence presented to the Transport Select Committee, 2002–03
Skem News
Ormskirk & Skelmersdale Advertiser
Champion Newspapers

 
Towns in Lancashire
New towns in England
New towns started in the 1960s
Unparished areas in Lancashire
Geography of the Borough of West Lancashire